Taizhou Luqiao Airport , formerly Huangyan Luqiao Airport, is a dual-use military and civil airport serving the city of Taizhou in Zhejiang Province, China.  It is located in Luqiao District, 20 kilometers from the city center. In 2010 the airport handled 616,861 passengers and 5,483 tons of cargo.

History
Luqiao Airport was originally a military airfield belonging to the People's Liberation Army Navy.  Construction of the airfield began in January 1954, and it was opened in July 1955.  In 1987 the airfield was converted to a dual-use military and civil airport and was named Huangyan Luqiao Airport.  In 1994 the county-level city of Huangyan was merged into the prefecture-level city of Taizhou and split into Huangyan and Luqiao districts, but the airport was only renamed Taizhou Luqiao Airport in December 2008, and its old name is still frequently used.

Facilities
The airport has one runway that is 2,500 meters long and 60 meters wide, and a 7,850 square-meter terminal building.  It is designed to handle 600,000 passengers per year.

Proposed new airport
To handle the growing traffic volume, a new dedicated civil airport is being planned to replace Luqiao Airport, with an estimated total investment of 800 million to 1 billion yuan.  When built the new airport will have a handling capacity of 2.5 million passengers annually.

Airlines and destinations

The following airlines serve Taizhou Luqiao Airport:

See also
List of airports in China
List of the busiest airports in China
List of People's Liberation Army Air Force airbases

References

External links
Official website

Airports in Zhejiang
Chinese Air Force bases
Airports established in 1955
1955 establishments in China
Airports established in 1987
1987 establishments in China
Taizhou, Zhejiang